The 1817 Rhode Island gubernatorial election was held on April 16, 1817.

Incumbent Federalist Governor William Jones ran for election to a seventh term but was defeated by Democratic-Republican nominee Nehemiah R. Knight.

General election

Candidates
Nehemiah R. Knight, Democratic, clerk of the circuit court, collector of customs
William Jones, Federalist, incumbent Governor

Results

County results

References

1817
Rhode Island
Gubernatorial